River Valley High School may refer to the following schools:

Singapore 
 River Valley High School, Singapore

United States 
River Valley High School (Arizona), Mohave Valley, Arizona
River Valley High School (California), Yuba City, California
River Valley High School (Iowa), River Valley Community School District, Correctionville, Iowa
River Valley High School (Michigan), Three Oaks, Michigan
River Valley High School (Caledonia, Ohio), Caledonia, Ohio
River Valley High School (Cheshire, Ohio), Cheshire, Ohio
River Valley High School (Spring Green, Wisconsin), a high school in Wisconsin
River Valley Charter School, Lakeside, California